Alan Mannus (born 19 May 1982) is a Northern Irish professional goalkeeper who plays for Shamrock Rovers. He began his career at Linfield, and during his time there he had spells on loan at Larne and Carrick Rangers. He then signed for Shamrock Rovers and in 2011, moved to St Johnstone. He has played for Northern Ireland at international level.

Career

Linfield
After rising through Linfield's junior ranks, Mannus made his first senior squad appearance in 2002. He established himself as the club's first choice goalkeeper at a young age and made his 250th appearance before his 25th birthday.

Mannus is one of the few goalkeepers to have scored a goal in the run of play. In a match against Omagh Town in 2003, his long goal kick bounced over the head of opposing goalkeeper Gavin Cullen and into the net. As a result of scoring his first goal, he was given the Player of the Month award for October 2003. At the end of the 2003–04 season, Mannus signed a two-year contract with the club.

During his career at Linfield, Mannus helped the club win trophies, such as the Irish League/Irish Premier League,
Irish League Cup and County Antrim Shield. In April 2008, Mannus was named the 2007–08 Ulster Footballer of the Year.

During his time at Linfield, Mannus was mentioned as a transfer target for a number of clubs, being linked to Everton in January 2005, Doncaster Rovers in April 2005 and Motherwell in December 2008. In August 2006, Mannus turned professional at Linfield and signed a three-year deal.

In November 2008, Mannus turned down the offer of a new contract by Linfield. and by April 2009, Linfield Manager David Jeffrey said he expected Mannus would leave the club and try to get a move to a club in England or Scotland.

At the end of his contract Mannus was linked with a move to Swansea City, and was reported to be training with Falkirk In July 2009, he was given a trial with English League Two side Bradford City, but after playing three games without conceding a goal, he was released and returned home.

Shamrock Rovers
In August 2009, Mannus signed for Shamrock Rovers. A week after joining, he made his debut for Michael O'Neill's side in a 2–2 draw against Dundalk on 22 August 2009.

In his second season at the club, Shamrock Rovers won the 2010 League of Ireland. After winning his first title at the club, Mannus said he had no regrets about the move, even if it harmed his international career.

Mannus was nominated for the PFAI Players' Player of the Year award in 2010, but lost out to Richie Ryan of Sligo Rovers. He was awarded the Soccer Writers Association of Ireland Goalkeeper of the Year Award for 2010.

In his final match for the club, Mannus kept a clean sheet in a 0–0 draw away to Flora Tallinn on 19 July 2011, in the Champions League Second qualifying round second leg meaning Shamrock Rovers went through to the next round, winning 1–0 on aggregate.

St Johnstone
Mannus signed a one-year contract with St Johnstone on 21 July 2011, after invoking a clause in his Shamrock Rovers contract that allowed him to leave if a British club made an offer after 20 July 2011. Initially Mannus was a back-up goalkeeper behind Peter Enckelman, but after Enckelman conceded five goals against Dundee United, with two of the goals coming from his mistakes, Mannus was given his chance, making his debut for the club in the Scottish Cup Fifth round replay, as St Johnstone lost 2–1 against Hearts on 14 February 2012. He then made his league debut for the club in the following game, on 19 February 2012, in a 0–0 draw against Aberdeen. After getting into the team, Mannus said he believed playing first team football would help his international career. At the end of the season he signed a 12-month extension.

In the 2012–13 season, Mannus helped St Johnstone to finish in third place in the SPL, ensuring qualification for the Europa League. At the end of the season, he signed another one-year contract with the club.

The 2013–14 season started well for Mannus, keeping a clean sheet as St Johnstone won 1–0 away to Norwegian side Rosenberg on 18 July 2013, in the Europa League second qualifying round first leg. After drawing 1–1 in the second leg St Johnstone went through 2–1 on aggregate, afterwards Mannus suggested that Rosenberg had been "arrogant" and had underestimated St Johnstone. In the next round St Johnstone won away from home in the first leg again, beating Minsk 1–0, but lost by the same scoreline at home in the second leg and were then defeated on penalties, despite Mannus saving twice during the shoot-out.

On 11 August 2013, Mannus sustained a shoulder injury during a match against Kilmarnock, which ruled him out for six weeks. He came back from his injury earlier than expected, making his return on 14 September 2013, in a 2–1 loss against Hibernian. On 18 January 2014, Mannus was sent-off, along with Ryan Stevenson of Hearts after they were involved in an alteration "following an angry goalmouth melee". He would miss one match after the club decided against appealing the sending off. While serving his suspension, Mannus fractured a bone in his thumb, which was expected to keep him out for six to eight weeks. However, he made his return to the side after only two weeks, on 16 February 2014, as St Johnstone lost 3–0 against Celtic.

On 21 February 2014, Mannus signed a new one-year contract until 31 May 2015. Mannus started in the Scottish Cup final on 17 May 2014, as St Johnstone won 2–0 against Dundee United to win the first major trophy in their 130-year history.

The 2014–15 season started well for Mannus, as he saved a penalty from Marco Schneuwly during a shoot-out as St Johnstone beat Luzern in the Europa League 2nd Qualifying Round. With his contract expiring at the end of the season, Mannus's future was uncertain, leading the club to immediately start talks over a new contract. Mannus extended his contract with St Johnstone for a further two years, until 2017, on 6 April 2015. Mannus was an ever-present player throughout the 2014–15 season and helped the club qualify for the Europa League for the third season running.

In April 2018, St Johnstone announced that Mannus would leave the club when his contract expires at the end of the 2017–18 season.

Shamrock Rovers
On 18 April 2018, Mannus signed a pre-contract with Shamrock Rovers, signing for the club for a second time, with the move due to be completed on 1 July 2018. In Mannus's first season back he would go on to play every minute of their league campaign in which Rovers finished second and also lift the FAI Cup beating Dundalk on penalties, providing crucial saves in the shootout.

In 2020 Mannus was part of the Shamrock Rovers squad who won the League of Ireland for a record 18th time and came runner up in the FAI Cup. He played every minute of the league season, keeping 13 clean sheets in 18 games as Rovers won the title without losing a game. Mannus also made the crucial save in Rovers’ epic 13-12 penalty shoot-out win over Ilves (football) in the 2020–21 UEFA Europa League qualifiers.

In the 2021 League of Ireland Premier Division Rovers regained their title and Mannus saved a penalty in the 2021–22 UEFA Champions League qualifiers at ŠK Slovan Bratislava

International career

Mannus (who moved back to Northern Ireland from Mississauga, Ontario with his family at the age of seven) won his first Northern Ireland cap against Trinidad and Tobago in the summer of 2004. He has also made appearances in friendlies against Bulgaria, Georgia and World Champions Italy. In a December 2015 interview, Mannus revealed that prior to becoming cap tied to Northern Ireland no one from the Canadian FA had ever been in touch with him regarding representing Canada.

Personal life
His brothers live in Northern Ireland. Ian plays football currently with Sirocco Works F.C. and Toby plays rugby for Belfast based Cooke Rugby Club.

Honours

Club

Linfield
Irish League/Irish Premier League(5): 2000–01, 2003–04, 2005–06, 2006–07, 2007–08.
Irish Cup (4): 2001–02, 2005–06, 2006–07, 2007–08
Irish League Cup (2): 2005–06, 2007–08
County Antrim Shield (4): 2000–01, 2003–04, 2004–05, 2005–06
Setanta Cup (1): 2005
Ulster Footballer of the Year: 2007–08

Shamrock Rovers
League of Ireland (5): 2010, 2011, 2020, 2021,  2022
FAI Cup (1): 2019
Setanta Cup (1): 2011
President of Ireland's Cup (1): 2022SWAI Goalkeeper of the Year (3): 2010, 2020, 2022St JohnstoneScottish Cup (1)''': 2013–14

References

External links
Northern Ireland stats at Irish FA
Profile Page at Shamrock Rovers

1982 births
Living people
Soccer players from Toronto
Association footballers from Northern Ireland
Northern Ireland international footballers
Canadian soccer players
Canadian people of Northern Ireland descent
Association football goalkeepers
Linfield F.C. players
Larne F.C. players
Carrick Rangers F.C. players
Shamrock Rovers F.C. players
St Johnstone F.C. players
Ulster Footballers of the Year
People from County Down
League of Ireland players
NIFL Premiership players
Scottish Premier League players
Scottish Professional Football League players
UEFA Euro 2016 players
Canadian expatriate soccer players
Canadian expatriate sportspeople in Scotland